Mourad Zahou (born 26 October 1989) is a Tunisian football defender who currently plays for CS Hammam-Lif.

References

1989 births
Living people
Tunisian footballers
EGS Gafsa players
ES Métlaoui players
US Ben Guerdane players
Stade Gabèsien players
CS Hammam-Lif players
Association football defenders
Tunisian Ligue Professionnelle 1 players
People from Gafsa Governorate